David Balleri (born 28 March 1969) is an Italian former footballer who played as a defender.

Career
On 22 October 2006, Balleri played his 300th Serie A match, in a 0–0 tie against Siena; he had played his first Serie A match on 8 September 1993.

In 2009–10 season he played for Pro Livorno in Prima Categoria Toscana. He retired after obtaining a UEFA A coaching license, which made him eligible to coach Lega Pro teams. He remains as coach of the Pro Livorno Juniores Regionali youth team.

Personal life
Davide's father Costanzo Balleri also played and coached football professionally.

Honours
Parma
 UEFA Super Cup: 1993
 UEFA Cup Winners' Cup: (Runner-up) 1993–94

References

External links
 David Balleri at livornocalcio.it
http://aic.football.it/scheda/295/balleri-david.htm

1969 births
U.S. Siracusa players
Cosenza Calcio 1914 players
U.S. Livorno 1915 players
Como 1907 players
Calcio Padova players
Association football defenders
Italian footballers
Italian football managers
Living people
Parma Calcio 1913 players
Sportspeople from Livorno
Serie A players
Serie B players
Serie C players
U.C. Sampdoria players
U.S. Lecce players
Footballers from Tuscany